Hard Call: Great Decisions and the Extraordinary People Who Made Them is a book written by United States Senator John McCain with Mark Salter.  Its theme is decision-making based on personal principles. The hardcover edition was released August 14, 2007, and the paperback edition was subsequently released on February 29, 2008.

McCain outlines a six-part structure for "hard calls," with several detailed anecdotes illustrating each of the six parts:

 Awareness: Jackie Robinson "intruding" into all-white baseball; and Wernher von Braun, the rocket scientist. 
 Foresight: Winston Churchill; Alexander Graham Bell; and Ronald Reagan when standing up to the Soviet Union. 
 Timing: Boeing's production of the commercial jet aircraft; Gillette's invention of the disposable razor; and Anwar Sadat and Menachem Begin meeting for the peace process. 
 Confidence: Civil War General George B. McClellan; Gertrude Ederle, the first woman to swim the English Channel; and the Apollo 11 astronauts. 
 Humility: The founding of Liberia; Harry Truman; and Gerald Ford's pardoning of Richard Nixon. 
 Inspiration: The white commander of America's first black regiment; Alexander Solzhenitsyn; and Abraham Lincoln.

References

External links
 Amazon.com's book reviews and description 
 Barnes & Noble's editorial reviews and overview 
 OnTheIssues.org's book review and excerpts

2007 non-fiction books
Books by John McCain
Hachette (publisher) books
Books by Mark Salter
Decision-making
Collaborative non-fiction books